The tenth Connecticut House of Representatives district elects one member of the Connecticut House of Representatives. Its current representative is Henry Genga, who won a 2006 special election to replace former Rep. Melody Currey upon her election as Mayor of East Hartford in 2005. The district consists of parts of the city of East Hartford.

List of representatives

Recent elections

External links 
 Google Maps - Connecticut House Districts

References

10
East Hartford, Connecticut